

Helmuth Hufenbach (27 February 1908 – 27 March 1945) was a German officer in the Wehrmacht of Nazi Germany during World War II. Hufenbach was killed on 27 March 1945 in the Heiligenbeil Pocket.  He was posthumously promoted to Generalmajor and awarded the Knight's Cross of the Iron Cross with Oak Leaves.

Awards and decorations
 Iron Cross (1939) 2nd Class (21 September 1939) & 1st Class (24 October 1939)

 German Cross in Gold on 27 November 1941 as Hauptmann in the III./Infanterie-Regiment 45
 Knight's Cross of the Iron Cross with Oak Leaves
 Knight's Cross on 30 October 1943 as Oberstleutnant and commander of Grenadier-Regiment 667
 807th Oak Leaves on 28 March 1945 as Oberst and commander of 562. Volks-Grenadier Division

References

Citations

Bibliography

 
 

1908 births
1945 deaths
People from Oldenburg (state)
Major generals of the German Army (Wehrmacht)
Recipients of the Gold German Cross
Recipients of the Knight's Cross of the Iron Cross with Oak Leaves
German Army personnel killed in World War II
Military personnel from Oldenburg (city)